Drewitt is a surname. Notable people with the surname include:

 Brett Drewitt (born 1990), Australian professional golfer 
 Herbert Drewitt (1895–1927), New Zealand World War I flying ace

See also
 DeWitt (name)
 Drewett, surname
 Druitt, surname